The 2005 Fresno State football team represented California State University, Fresno in the 2005 NCAA Division I-A football season, and competed as a member of the Western Athletic Conference.  Led by head coach Pat Hill, the Bulldogs played their home games at Bulldog Stadium in Fresno, California.

Season Notes
The 2005 season was among the most remarkable in recent memory, with the Bulldogs beating archrival Hawaii in the islands for the first time since 1994; beating WAC rival Boise State for the first time since they joined the WAC; and taking the two-time national champion USC Trojans to the wire in a memorable game in Los Angeles.

Personnel

Coaching staff

Roster

Schedule

Game summaries

Weber State

at Oregon

Toledo

at New Mexico State

Utah State

at Idaho

at Hawaii

San Jose State

Boise State

at Southern California

at Nevada

Louisiana Tech

vs. Tulsa (Liberty Bowl)

References

Fresno State
Fresno State Bulldogs football seasons
Fresno State Bulldogs football